The 1982 Akron Zips football team represented Akron University in the 1982 NCAA Division I-AA football season as a member of the Ohio Valley Conference. Led by 10th-year head coach Jim Dennison, the Zips played their home games at the Rubber Bowl in Akron, Ohio. They finished the season with a record of 6–5 overall and 5–2 in OVC play to tie for second place.

Schedule

References

Akron
Akron Zips football seasons
Akron Zips football